Trans-Europ-Express is a 1966 experimental film written and directed by Alain Robbe-Grillet and starring Jean-Louis Trintignant and Marie-France Pisier. The title refers to the Trans Europ Express, at the time an international rail network in Europe. A frame story shows a creative team devising a film plot during a train journey to Antwerp, intercut with a film-within-the-film about a novice cocaine smuggler and a prostitute that enacts their outline imperfectly.

Plot
The film-within-the-film features a Frenchman named Elias who takes his first consignment of cocaine from Paris to Antwerp on the Trans Europ Express. There he is passed from one mysterious intermediary to another and, with some time to spare, enacts a rape fantasy with a prostitute called Eva. Eventually he reaches his top contact, who reveals that his cargo was powdered sugar and the whole exercise was a test of his loyalty. Told that his next assignment will be to take a shipment back to Paris, he looks up Eva for another session and discovers there that she has betrayed him to the police. Initiating a bondage fantasy, he strangles her and immediately goes into hiding. Slipping out to buy a newspaper he sees a report of the murder above an advertisement for a strip club where the star performer in a bondage fantasy looks very like Eva. On arriving there he is surrounded by police but, before they can arrest him, he is shot dead by his contact.

When the characters in the frame story return to Paris and buy a newspaper, behind them in the crowd one can see Elias and Eva embracing.

Cast
 Jean-Louis Trintignant as Elias
 Marie-France Pisier as Eva
 Christian Barbier as Lorentz
 Charles Millot as Franck
 Daniel Emilfork as policeman
 Henri Lambert as police inspector
 Alain Robbe-Grillet as Jean, the film director
 Catherine Robbe-Grillet as Lucette
 Virginie Vignon as shop assistant
 Gérard Palaprat as waiter
 Nadine Verdier as chambermaid
 Jess Hahn as police inspector (uncredited)
 Prima Symphony as stripper

Reception
Screenwriter Robert McKee claims Trans-Europ-Express is a "nonplot" film—that is, a film that does not tell a story.

The film was released on DVD in 2008 in Italy by Ripley's Home Video and on Blu-ray in 2014 in the US by Redemption Films.

References

Further reading
Gardies, André, comp. (1972) Alain Robbe-Grillet. Paris: Seghers (includes: "documents" & "points de vue", pp. 126–32, 162)

External links
 
 

1966 films
1960s avant-garde and experimental films
1960s erotic thriller films
1960s French-language films
BDSM in films
Belgian avant-garde and experimental films
Belgian black-and-white films
Belgian erotic thriller films
Films about filmmaking
Films directed by Alain Robbe-Grillet
Films set on trains
Films shot in Antwerp
French avant-garde and experimental films
French black-and-white films
French erotic thriller films
French-language Belgian films
Self-reflexive films
1960s French films